Thioindigo is an organosulfur compound that is used to dye polyester fabric.  A synthetic dye, thioindigo is related to the plant-derived dye indigo, replacing two NH groups with two sulfur atoms to create a shade of pink. 

Thioindigo is generated by the alkylation  of the sulfur in thiosalicylic acid with chloroacetic acid.  The resulting thioether cyclizes to 2-hydroxythianaphthene, which is easily converted to thioindigo.  The related compound 4,7,4',7'-tetrachlorothioindigo, also a commercially important dye, can be prepared by chlorination of thioindigo.

References

Indigo structure dyes
Organosulfur compounds